Piteå Hockey Club, usually abbreviated Piteå HC, is a Swedish ice hockey club based in Piteå in Norrbotten, Sweden's northernmost county.  The club played six seasons, from 1999 to 2005, in Sweden's second-tier league, Allsvenskan.  , the team competes in the "Norra" (north) group of Division 1, the third tier of ice hockey in Sweden.

Piteå HC was founded in 1986 as a merger of the hockey sections of Piteå IF, Munksund/Skuthamns SK, and Öjebyns IF.

Season-by-season
This list includes only recent Piteå HC seasons.

References

External links
 Official website
 Profile on Eliteprospects.com

Ice hockey teams in Sweden
Ice hockey clubs established in 1986
1986 establishments in Sweden
Sport in Piteå
Ice hockey teams in Norrbotten County